Alzonne is a commune in the Aude department in the Occitanie region of southern France.

The inhabitants of the commune are known as 	Alzonnois or Alzonnoises

Geography
The commune is located in the Lauragais valley some 15 km west of Carcassonne and 15 km east of Castelnaudary.  The route D6113 passes through the commune from west to east between these two cities and becomes National Route N113 near Carcassonne.  The Autoroute des Deux Mers (A61, E80) passes just 1 km south of the commune but the nearest exit is to the D43 near Bram.  Other roads running into the commune are the D8 from Montolieu in the north, the D34 from Saint-Martin-le-Vieil in the northwest, and the D33 running west to east from Bram to Villesèquelande forms the southern border of the commune with a connecting road running north to the village. The Bordeaux-Sète railway runs west to east across the southern part of the commune but there is no station. The nearest station is at Bram.

The Fresquel river runs from west to east through the commune passing just south of the village and joining the Aude at Carcassonne. The Fresquel is joined by the Lampy just east of the village and a number of streams flow into the two rivers including the Ruisseau de Fontorbe, the Ruisseau de Rebenty, the Ruisseau de Falgous, and the Vernassonne which forms a part of the northern border of the commune. The Canal du Midi also passes through the southern part of the commune.

The commune is mostly farmland with some forests in the north. Apart from the village of Alzonne there are also the hamlets of Fongayraud and La Rode near the village, and La Migance in the north.

Neighbouring communes and villages

Toponymy
The name Alsona dates from 898 and comes from Fresquel. It is based on the Hydronymic root alz- meaning "alder" or "swamp" (Dauzat, Negre, Billy, Morvan) and the suffix -onna.

History
Alzonne from the 9th century was a town of some importance as it was once the capital of the viguerie of its name: vicaria Ausonensis; therefore Alzonne was also known in pago Carcassensi. In this respect the situation of Alzonne has hardly changed since this small town is today the capital of the canton of its name in the arrondissement of Carcassonne.

Its ancient and enduring importance is due to the fertility of its land and the rivers that form its fertile valley. Once the city was fortified and was besieged and taken three times during the Wars of Religion of the 16th century.  It was a strategic place in the crusade against the Albigensians.

Heraldry

Administration
List of Successive Mayors of Alzonne

Mayors from 1929

Population

Culture and heritage

Civil heritage
The commune has two structures that are registered as historical objects:
The War Memorial (1921)
The Monument to Vialatte (1902)

Other sites of interest
The Rébenty Aqueduct on the Canal du Midi across the Ruisseau de Rébenty

Religious heritage
The Church contains two items that are registered as historical objects:
A Bronze Bell (1782)
A Bronze Bell (1591)

Notable People linked to the commune
Jean Dours (1809-1877), Bishop of Soissons, was born in Alzonne
Antoine Gayraud (18 May 1910 in Alzonne - 18  March 1981 in Carcassonne), French politician
Françoise de Veyrinas (4 September 1943 - 16 August 2008), born and died in Alzonne, French politician

See also 
 Communes of the Aude department

References

External links
 Alzonne on the old National Geographic Institute website 
Alzonne on Géoportail, National Geographic Institute (IGN) website 
Alzonne on the 1750 Cassini Map

Communes of Aude